The 1995–97 FIRA Trophy (originally 1994–96) was arranged with a new format. In this season the schedules for France, Italy and Romania were modified to allow preparation for the 1995 Rugby World Cup, with a preliminary tournament being held for Division 1 only. The second tier teams played a tournament to qualify seven teams to the 1995–96 edition Trophy.

Seven teams (the first three of each pool) and the winner of a Play off between the two fourth-placed teams were admitted to the first division for the 1995–97 tournament.

Pool A 

Russia, Poland and Tunisia  qualified for 1995–97 FIRA Trophy . Belgium entered Play-off.

Pool B 

Spain, Portugal and Marocco  qualified for 1995–97 FIRA Trophy . Czech Republic entered Play-off.

Play Off 

Belgium qualified for 1995–97 FIRA Trophy

Second division 
Three Pools were played.

Pool A 

 Lithuania-Denmark not played

Pool B 
 Semifinals

 3–4 place final

 Final

Pool C

External links
1994-95 FIRA Preliminary Tournament at ESPN

Preliminary95
1994–95 in European rugby union
1994 rugby union tournaments for national teams
1995 rugby union tournaments for national teams